James Lafayette was the pseudonym of James Stack Lauder (1853–1923). He was a late Victorian and Edwardian portrait photographer, and managing director from 1898 to 1923 of a company in Dublin specializing in society photographs, Lafayette Ltd.
In 1887, he became the first Irish photographer to be granted a royal warrant.

Collections

While thousands of images were credited to Lafayette studios, only those 649 photographs which were registered for copyright bear his signature as author. These are now held in the Public Record Office, in Kew, London.  The Lafayette Collection at London's Victoria & Albert Museum consists of 3,500 glass plate and celluloid negatives. A further collection of 30,000 to 40,000 nitrate negatives is at London's National Portrait Gallery. Further collections are in the Royal Archives at Windsor Castle; and in private hands in Dublin.

Notes and references

 Anon, 1990. V&A. Brief history of the Lafayette Studio Retrieved: 5 January 2008. London: Victoria & Albert Museum.
 Meadows, Jane. 1990. V&A. James Lafayette biography Retrieved: 5 January 2008. London: Victoria & Albert Museum.
 Meadows, Jane. 2004. "Lauder, James Stack (1853–1923)", Oxford Dictionary of National Biography. Oxford: Oxford University Press. Online edition Retrieved: 6 January 2008.

External links

 The Lafayette Negative Archive
 Lafayette at the Devonshire House Ball 1897

1853 births
1923 deaths
Irish photographers